Neil Alexander Matheson (25 August 1904 – 1 April 1972) was a Liberal party member of the House of Commons of Canada. He was born in Rose Valley, Prince Edward Island and was also an editor, farmer and journalist.

He obtained a Bachelor of Arts degree at Mount Allison University. During World War II, he was a captain in the reserves.

Matheson was first elected with Angus MacLean at the Queen's electoral district in the 1953 general election, when that riding elected two members to Parliament. In the 1957 election, he was defeated when MacLean and fellow Progressive Conservative party candidate Heath MacQuarrie received the two highest votes.

References

External links
 

1904 births
1972 deaths
Members of the House of Commons of Canada from Prince Edward Island
Liberal Party of Canada MPs
Canadian farmers
Mount Allison University alumni
People from Queens County, Prince Edward Island